Tau Coronae Borealis, Latinized from τ Coronae Borealis, is a possible astrometric and spectroscopic binary star system in the northern constellation of Corona Borealis. It is visible to the naked eye with an apparent visual magnitude of 4.76.

Tau CrB has a visible companion of visual magnitude 13.2 and they have been treated as a common proper motion pair.  As of 2014, the pair had an angular separation of 2.20 arc seconds along a position angle of 186°.  It has also been described as a spectroscopic binary, but there is no confirmation of this.  Due to an abnormal space motion, it has also been described as an astrometric binary although there is no orbit.

Based upon an annual parallax shift of 27.95 mas as seen from Earth, it is located about 117 light years from the Sun. At that distance, the visual magnitude of the system is diminished by an extinction factor of 0.04 due to interstellar dust.

The primary component is a magnitude 4.89 K-type star with a stellar classification of K1 III-IV, having a spectrum that shows mixed traits of an evolved subgiant and giant star. It is catalogued as a red clump giant, which would indicate it is generating energy through helium fusion at its core. The star has expanded to six times the Sun's radius and is radiating 16 times the solar luminosity from its photosphere at an effective temperature of 4,742 K.

References

K-type giants
Horizontal-branch stars
Astrometric binaries
Corona Borealis
Coronae Borealis, Tau
Durchmusterung objects
Coronae Borealis, 16
145328
079119
6018